Argogorytes nigrifrons is a species of sand wasp in the family Crabronidae. It is found in North America.

References

Crabronidae
Hymenoptera of North America
Insects described in 1856
Taxa named by Frederick Smith (entomologist)
Articles created by Qbugbot